Anupam Amod is an Indian playback singer. He was born in Jaipur and graduated from SPA Delhi.

Playback singing
Anupam Amod released an album with Times Music titled Chandan Sa Badan which contained his song "Saude Bazi" from the 2010 movie Aakrosh composed by Pritam.

Partial discography

Awards and nominations

References

Bollywood playback singers
Indian male pop singers
Indian male playback singers
Living people
Year of birth missing (living people)